Plesiosaurs are a clade of extinct marine reptiles.

Record sizes

The group thus contained some of the largest marine apex predators in the fossil record, roughly equalling the longest ichthyosaurs, mosasaurids, sharks and toothed whales in size. However, it was recently argued that its size cannot be currently determined due to their being poorly reconstructed.

Plesiosauroids
The longest known plesiosauroid was Aristonectes at 11.86 metres (38.9 feet) long.

Longest plesiosauroids
 Aristonectes sp.: 
 Albertonectes vanderveldei: 
 Thalassomedon haningtoni: 
 Fresnosaurus drescheri: more than 
 Styxosaurus snowii: 
 Elasmosaurus platyurus: 
 Hydralmosaurus serpentinus: 
 Tuarangisaurus keyesi: 
 Hydrotherosaurus alexandrae: 

Pliosauroids

Longest pliosauroids
 The NHM symphysis:  
 The Peterborough vertebra: (hypothetical)
 Pliosaurus funkei:   
 Pliosaurus kevani: 
 Pliosaurus rossicus/Pliosaurus macromerus: 
 Monster of Aramberri: 
 Kronosaurus queenslandicus: 
 Megalneusaurus rex: 
 Rhomaleosaurus cramptoni:

Heaviest pliosauroids
 The NHM symphysis: 
 The Peterborough vertebra: (hypothetical)
 Pliosaurus rossicus/Pliosaurus macromerus: 
 Monster of Aramberri: 
 Pliosaurus funkei: 
 Pliosaurus kevani: 
 Kronosaurus queenslandicus:

References

Animal size
Plesiosaur-related lists